Films produced in Spain in the 2000s (decade) ordered by year of release on separate pages:

List of films by year
Spanish films of 2000
Spanish films of 2001
Spanish films of 2002
Spanish films of 2003
Spanish films of 2004
Spanish films of 2005
Spanish films of 2006
Spanish films of 2007
Spanish films of 2008
Spanish films of 2009

External links
 Spanish film at the Internet Movie Database

Spanish
Films